Zemin or Zemīn may refer to

Zemin (given name), Chinese given name
Zemin Station, Ningbo Rail Transit

See also
Zamin (disambiguation)
Zemina (surname)
Zemin Seyb, a village in Iran